"U Make Me Wanna" is a song by English boy band Blue. It was released as the third and final single from their second studio album, One Love (2002). It was released on 17 March 2003 in the United Kingdom and peaked at number four on the UK Singles Chart.

A bilingual remake of the same name was included on Elva Hsiao's Love's Theme Song, Kiss album. Blue was featured on the track and on the music video.

Music video
The music video for "U Make Me Wanna" was filmed in Cape Town, South Africa.

Track listings

UK CD single
 "U Make Me Wanna" – 3:39
 "U Make Me Wanna" (Urban North edit) – 3:18
 "Made for Loving You" – 3:25
 "U Make Me Wanna" (video) – 3:47
 4 × 30-second clips
 Are we sex symbols?
 "Long Time" (acappella)
 Behind the scenes/"U Make Me Wanna" (Urban North Edit audio snippet)
 Favourite...

UK cassette single
 "U Make Me Wanna" – 3:39
 "U Make Me Wanna" (Stargate extended mix) – 5:29
 "Made for Loving You" – 3:25

UK DVD single
 "U Make Me Wanna" (video)
 "U Make Me Wanna" (Urban North extended/photo gallery)
 "U Make Me Wanna" (Big Jay Remix/photo gallery)
 4 × 30-second clips
 Japan promo tour
 Dublin fans
 "One Love" (live)
 70's medley

European CD single
 "U Make Me Wanna" – 3:39
 "Made for Loving You" – 3:25

Credits and personnel
Credits are taken from the UK CD single liner notes.

Studio
 Recorded and mixed at StarGate Studios (Norway)

Personnel

 Steve Robson – writing
 John McLaughlin – writing
 Harry Wilkins – writing
 Blue – all vocals
 StarGate – production
 Mikkel SE – all instruments
 Hallgeir Rustan – all instruments
 Tor Erik Hermansen – all instruments
 Max Dodson – photography

Charts

Weekly charts

Year-end charts

References

2002 songs
2003 singles
Blue (English band) songs
Innocent Records singles
Song recordings produced by Stargate (record producers)
Songs written by Steve Robson
Virgin Records singles